Archibald Lybrand (May 23, 1840 – February 7, 1910) was a lawyer, soldier, businessman, and a U.S. Representative from Ohio for two terms from 1897 to 1901.

Biography
Born in Tarlton, Ohio, Lybrand moved to Delaware, Ohio, in 1857. He attended the common schools and the Ohio Wesleyan University at Delaware.

During the Civil War, he enlisted in the Union Army on April 26, 1861, and served in Company I, Fourth Regiment, Ohio Volunteer Infantry. He later transferred to Company E, Seventy-third Regiment, Ohio Volunteer Infantry, and was promoted to first lieutenant. He was later commissioned as the company's captain. He remained in the service three years.

After mustering out, he returned to Delaware, Ohio, where he served as mayor in 1869. He studied law and was admitted to the bar in 1871. He was a landowner and also engaged in agricultural and mercantile pursuits. He served as the postmaster of Delaware from 1881–85.

Congress 
Lybrand was elected as a Republican to the Fifty-fifth and Fifty-sixth Congresses (March 4, 1897 – March 3, 1901). He was an unsuccessful candidate for renomination in 1900 and resumed his business activities in Delaware, Ohio.

Death
He died in Daytona, Florida, February 7, 1910, and was interred in Oak Grove Cemetery, Delaware, Ohio.

Notes

References
 Retrieved on 2008-09-28

External links

1840 births
1910 deaths
People from Tarlton, Ohio
People from Delaware, Ohio
Burials at Oak Grove Cemetery, Delaware, Ohio
Union Army officers
People of Ohio in the American Civil War
Ohio Wesleyan University alumni
Mayors of places in Ohio
19th-century American politicians
Republican Party members of the United States House of Representatives from Ohio